Nyangumarta may refer to:
 Nyangumarta people of Western Australia
 Nyangumarta language, their language